Kajaanin Haka (abbreviated KajHa) is a football club from Kajaani in Finland.  The club was formed in 1953 and their home ground is at the Kajaanin liikuntapuisto.  The men's football first team currently plays in the Kolmonen (Third Division).  The Chairman of KajHa is Jarmo Anttonen.

Background
KajHa was founded on 15 March 1953 and in the early years the club was known as Hevossuon Haka.  The change to the current name was made on 23 January 1963.  Originally Haka was a typical village club, which in addition to football ran sections providing for sports of athletics, skiing, and volleyball. Specialisation in football occurred in the early 1960s and has remained the popular activity.  There are currently 245 registered players and the number is growing all the time.

The club's first taste of success was in 1968 when they played one season in the Suomisarjaa (Finland League) which at that time was the second tier of Finnish football.  They have had four other periods at this level, currently known as the Ykkönen (First Division) in 1970–71, 1985–86, 1993–94, 1998–99.

Haka have had nine periods covering 21 seasons in the Kakkonen (Second Division), the third tier of Finnish football covering 1975, 1979, 1981–84, 1987, 1990–92, 1995–97, 2000–05, 2007 and the current season 2010.

In 1999 KajHa won the Työväen Urheiluliiton Cup (Workers' Sports Federation Cup) for the first time in their history.

The attendance record for a KajHa match was the 1968 derby match with Kajaanin Palloilijat which was watched by 2,376 spectators.

Season to season

Junior Section

The club provides for 5 different age groups for boys and in 2008 .  In 2008 Kajaani Haka was selected as northern Finland's first football club to meet the new quality standards for coaching from which benefits are now experienced throughout the Kainuu region.

The club runs the Kainuun nappulaliiga (Kainuu Little League) for 5–12 years old boys and girls throughout the year. It covers almost the whole of the Kainuu region including Paltamo, Puolanka, Suomussalmi, Hyrynsalmi, Sotkamo, Kuhmo and Kajaani.

A traditional event provided by the club in the winter in January and February is the Tammiturnaus.

Club Structure

KajHa currently has 1 men's team and 5 boys teams.

Current squad

References and sources
Official Website
Finnish Wikipedia
 Kajaanin Haka Facebook

Footnotes

Football clubs in Finland
Haka
1953 establishments in Finland